HTMS Prachuap Khiri Khan is the second Krabi Class offshore patrol vessel (OPV) of the Royal Thai Navy.

She is a modified , and was built by Mahidol Adulyadej Naval Dockyard, with design and technology transfer support from BAE Systems Surface Ships. The ship was constructed at the Royal Thai Navy Mahidol Dockyard in Sattahip. The ship was launched in the presence of HRH Princess Maha Chakri Sirindhorn, second daughter of King Bhumibol Adulyadej on 2 August 2019.

References 

Krabi-class patrol vessels of the Royal Thai Navy
Ships built in Thailand
2019 ships